Idol Tour is a 2017 South Korean television program starring Joosuc, Jisook and DinDin. It airs on MBC Music on Thursday at 22:00 (KST) beginning 20 July 2017. From 2 September 2017, it will be aired on Saturday at 10:30 (KST).

It is a variety show made to provide busy idols with a healing vacation. Every week, the cast and guests (mainly 2 members of an idol group) go for a tour in a city around South Korea, through 2 teams (1 team leader and 1 member of the idol group in a team, the guests will change team leader during the episode). In each episode, at some spots the 2 teams go around separately, other times the 2 teams alongside the CEO (Joosuc) gather together to tour spots. At the end of each episode, a best tour guide is chosen through voting from the 2 guests and the CEO.

Cast
Joosuc (CEO)
Jisook (Team Leader)
DinDin (Team Leader)

Episodes

2017

External links
 

South Korean historical television series